Ostap Steckiw (March 14, 1924 – April 13, 2001) was a Canadian soccer player who earned 1 cap for the Canadian national side against the United States in 1957, scoring one goal. During World War II he was a member of the Ukrainian Insurgent Army. He was awarded the UPA Golden Cross.

Career 
He played club football for ST Ukraina Lviv, Phönix Karlsruhe, Charleroi, Nice, Valenciennes, Lyon, Toronto Ukrainians, and Rochester Ukrainians.

In 1942 Steckiw became the champion of Halychyna playing for ST Ukraina Lwów. In 1957 he was the Canadian Challenger's Cup holder playing for Montreal Ukrainians.

International career 
He played a single game for Canada in Saint Louis against the United States along with two other Ukrainian Canadians: Mike Bereza and Walt Zakaluznyj.

Managerial career 
After retiring Steckiw in 1961 served as a player-coach with Toronto's Inter-Roma originally in the National Soccer League (NSL) then later in the Eastern Canada Professional Soccer League. On June 27, 1963 he resigned as head coach and was replaced by Renato Seghini. In 1968, he returned to manage in the NSL with Toronto Ukraina. He was named the head coach for Toronto Ukraina once more for the 1974 season.

He created a soccer museum in Toronto. In 1946 in city of Ulm, West Germany Steckiw created a football team "Ukraina".

References

External links
  Story of the Ukrainian Canadians 
 Ukrainian Football Diaspora @ Sport.ua

Canadian soccer coaches
Canadian soccer players
Canadian expatriate soccer players
Canada men's international soccer players
Karlsruher SC players
OGC Nice players
Valenciennes FC players
Olympique Lyonnais players
Philadelphia Ukrainian Nationals players
Toronto Roma players
Ligue 1 players
Ligue 2 players
Polish emigrants to Canada
1924 births
2001 deaths
Sportspeople from Lviv
People from Lwów Voivodeship
Ukrainian footballers
Ukrainian people of World War II
Ukrainian Insurgent Army
Canadian National Soccer League players
Eastern Canada Professional Soccer League players
Association football midfielders
Expatriate soccer players in the United States
Canadian expatriate sportspeople in the United States
Canadian National Soccer League coaches
Toronto Ukrainians players
Rochester Ukrainians players
Toronto Tridents players
Montreal Ukrainians players